
Year 126 BC was a year of the pre-Julian Roman calendar. At the time it was known as the Year of the Consulship of Lepidus and Orestes (or, less frequently, year 628 Ab urbe condita) and the Third Year of Yuanshuo. The denomination 126 BC for this year has been used since the early medieval period, when the Anno Domini calendar era became the prevalent method in Europe for naming years.

Events 
 By place 
 Syria 
 Tyre successfully revolts from the Seleucid Empire.
 Seleucus V Philometor succeeds his father Demetrius II as king of the Seleucid Empire. Due to his youth, his stepmother Cleopatra Thea acts as regent.

 Xiongnu 
 Winter 127/6: The Xiongnu ruler Junchen Chanyu dies, and his younger brother Yizhixie, the Luli King of the Left (East), overthrows Junchen's son Yudan and sets himself up as the new Chanyu. Yudan flees to the Han and dies a few months later.

 China 
 Summer: In retaliation for the Han conquest of the Ordos Plateau in the previous year, the Xiongnu invade the province of Dai, kill its governor, Gong You, and carry off over 1000 of its inhabitants. 
 Autumn: The Xiongnu cross into Yanmen and kill or carry off over 1000 of the inhabitants.
 Having used the Xiongnu civil war to escape his imprisonment, the diplomat Zhang Qian returns to China and reports on the lands to the west.
 To avoid the Xiongnu and Qiang of the north-west and west respectively, Emperor Wu begins a policy of exploring a possible route of contact with Daxia (Bactria) via India, sending envoys to establish diplomatic relations with and movement through the Dian Kingdom. Wu wishes to receive the submission of Daxia and other states in western Eurasia.

Deaths 
 Phraates II, king of the Parthian Empire 
 Wang Zhi, Chinese empress of the Han Dynasty (b. 173 BC)

References